Chapada de Areia is a municipality located in the Brazilian state of Tocantins. Its population was 1,410 (2020) and its area is 659 km².

The municipality contains 2% of the  Ilha do Bananal / Cantão Environmental Protection Area, created in 1997.

References

Municipalities in Tocantins